Uganda competed at the 2018 Commonwealth Games in the Gold Coast, Australia from April 4 to April 15, 2018.

Netball player Peace Proscovia was the country's flag bearer during the opening ceremony.

Medalists

Competitors
The following is the list of number of competitors participating at the Games per sport/discipline.

Athletics

Men
Track & road events

Women
Track & road events

Field events

Badminton

Uganda participated with four athletes (two men and two women)

Singles

Doubles

Mixed team

Roster
Bridget Bangi
Edwin Ekiring
Brian Kasirye
Aisha Nakiyemba

Pool C

Boxing

Uganda participated with a team of 5 athletes (5 men).

Men

Cycling

Uganda participated with 2 athletes (2 men).

Road
Men

Netball

Uganda qualified a netball team by virtue of being ranked in the top 11 (excluding the host nation, Australia) of the INF World Rankings on July 1, 2017. The country will be making its Commonwealth Games debut in the sport.

Roster

Ajio Lilian
Betty Kizza
Ruth Meme
Hadijah Nakabuye
Halima Nakachwa
Joan Nampungu
Muhayimina Namuwaya
Stella Nanfuka
Florence Nanyonga
Racheal Nanyonga
Stella Oyella
Proscovia Peace

Pool B

Fifth place match

Rugby sevens

Men's tournament

Uganda qualified a men's rugby sevens team of 12 athletes, by winning the 2017 Africa Cup Sevens.

Roster

Desire Ayera
Joseph Jadwong
Adrian Kasito
Timothy Kisiga
Ivan Magomu
James Odongo
Aaron Ofoyrwoth
Pius Ogena
Solomon Okia
Micheal Okorach
Lawrence Ssebuliba
Philip Wokorach

Pool D

Shooting

Uganda participated with 1 athlete (1 woman).

Squash

Uganda participated with 2 athletes (2 men).

Individual

Doubles

Swimming

Uganda participated with 2 athletes (1 man and 1 woman).

Table tennis

Uganda participated with 2 athletes (1 man and 1 woman).

Singles

Doubles

Weightlifting

Uganda participated with 4 athletes (3 men and 1 woman).

See also
Uganda at the 2018 Summer Youth Olympics

References

Nations at the 2018 Commonwealth Games
Uganda at the Commonwealth Games
2018 in Ugandan sport